Emiliano Veliaj (born 9 February 1985) is a retired Albanian footballer who played as a midfielder. He was a member of the Albania national Team between 2010 and 2012, earning 2 full caps.

Club career

Korabi Peshkopi
On 1 July 2016, Veliaj agreed personal terms and signed a one-year contract with newly promoted Albanian Superliga side Korabi Peshkopi for an undisclosed fee. In a press conference later that month, Veliaj stated that Korabi made the best offer for him, despite interest from several other Albanian clubs. He made his debut for the club on 7 September in the opening league match of 2016–17 season against his former team Laçi, playing full-90 minutes in a goalless draw. He also played in the two-legged match against Kamza in the first round of Albanian Cup, as Korabi was eliminated with the aggregate 3–1. During the first part of the season, Veliaj made 13 league appearances, in addition 2 in cup, failing to score in the process, as Korabi struggled for results, finishing it in the penultimate spot.

Tomori Berat
On 26 January 2017, Veliaj returned to his boyhood club Tomori Berat for the first time in 12 years. He was immediately placed in the starting lineup, making his return debut on 3 February in the matchday 14 against Pogradeci. During the second part of 2016–17 season, Veliaj played 10 matches without scoring and left the team following the end of the season.

Korabi Peshkopi return
On 30 August 2017, after training for a while with Egnatia, Veliaj returned to Korabi Peshkopi this time in Albanian First Division as a free transfer.

International career
Veliaj made his senior debut on 2 June 2010 by appearing in the last minutes of the friendly against Andorra, which ended in a 1–0 home win for Albania. After two years, he was called up again by the new coach Gianni De Biasi for the friendlies against Qatar and Iran in May 2012. He made another senior appearance, this time against Iran at the İnönü Stadium, Istanbul, Turkey, entering in the last moments in a 1–0 win.

Honours
Besa Kavajë
 Albanian Cup: 2006–07

Laçi
 Albanian Cup: 2014–15
 Albanian Supercup: 2015

References

External links
 Profile - FSHF
 
 

1985 births
Living people
Sportspeople from Berat
Association football midfielders
Albanian footballers
Albania youth international footballers
Albania under-21 international footballers
FK Tomori Berat players
Besa Kavajë players
KF Laçi players
KS Shkumbini Peqin players
KF Teuta Durrës players
KF Korabi Peshkopi players
FK Vora players
KS Burreli players
KF Luz i Vogël 2008 players
Kategoria Superiore players
Kategoria e Parë players
Kategoria e Dytë players
Albania international footballers